Manuel Arvizu O.F.M.  (April 13, 1919 – November 6, 2009) was a Mexican Bishop of the Roman Catholic Church

Arvizu was born in Etzatlán, Mexico and ordained on June 24, 1945, from the religious order of Order of Friars Minor. He was appointed Prelature of Jesús María del Naya on May 24, 1962, along with Titular Bishop of Dusa and was ordained a bishop on August 15, 1962. Arvizu resigned as Titular bishop of Dusa in 1978 and resigned from Prelature of Jesús María del Naya on June 27, 1992.

External links
Catholic-Hierarchy

1919 births
2009 deaths
20th-century Roman Catholic bishops in Mexico
Mexican people of Basque descent
Participants in the Second Vatican Council